Joshua is a 2020 Indian film made in Malayalam-language, directed by Peter Sunder Dhas starring Master Abel Peter and Priyanka Nair. The principal photography of the film began on 5 September 2019 and the film was released on 28 February 2020.

Summary 
Joshua is a psychological film that shows the impact of the medium of cinema on the minds of children and how it affect their lives.

Cast 
 
Master Abel Peter as Joshua
Priyanka Nair as Annie
Hemanth Menon as Arjun
Anu Tressa
Dinesh Panicker
Anand   
Manka Mahesh
Feby Tharakan
Anil Pappan
Rajkumar
Thirumala Ramachandran
Alex Koyipurath
Anju Nair

Production 
First time director Peter Sunder Dhas was backed by the production house The Alive Media to make a film based on a psychological subject. Actress Priyanka Nair and child actor Abel Peter were signed for the film. Later, actors Hemanth Menon and Dinesh Panicker joined the film that was shot at the locations of Thiruvananthapuram and Varkala. Interestingly the first look poster of director Gautham Vasudev Menon's film with the same title was released around the same time creating a confusion. Miss South India contestant Anu Tressa also was signed to play the romantic pair of Hemanth Menon. Gopi Sundar was assigned for the songs and background score.

References

External links
 

2020 films
2020s Malayalam-language films
Films shot in Thiruvananthapuram
2020 psychological thriller films